Throw Me in the River  is the third studio album by Australian punk band The Smith Street Band. It was released on Poison City Records in October 2014.

Track listing

 The 2015 expanded edition combines Throw Me in the River and The Smith Street Band's 2015 single Wipe That Shit-Eating Grin Off Your Punchable Face.

Charts

Personnel
The Smith Street Band
Wil Wagner - vocals, guitar, keyboards
Lee Hartney - guitar, vocals
Michael "Fitzy" Fitzgerald - bass
Chris Cowburn - drums, vocals

Other musicians
Nathan Holt - trombone, trumpet
Jemma King - cello
Lucy Rash - violin
Jeff Rosenstock - guitar, keyboards, piano, saxophone, synthesizer
Todd Roth - trumpet
Bob Vielma - trombone
James Morris - double bass

References

2014 albums
The Smith Street Band albums
Banquet Records albums
SideOneDummy Records albums